Cicindis horni is a species of beetles in the family Carabidae, the only species in the genus Cicindis. The Cicindis classification is designated by autapotypic features including but not limited to a lack of supraorbital setiferous punctures (with these punctures being instead on the basal setiferous), dorsal surface of mandible shown with obliquely transverse grooves, and one or more tarsomeres on each leg with fringes of accessory setae.

References

Nebriinae
Monotypic Carabidae genera